Martsa is a village in Toila Parish, Ida-Viru County in northeastern Estonia. As of 2011 Census, the settlement's population was 27.

References

Villages in Ida-Viru County